Dibyendu Adhikari (born 24 December 1976) is an Indian politician from the state of West Bengal in India. He has been elected to Lok Sabha from Tamluk in 2019 as a member of Trinamool Congress.

Dibyendu Adhikari's father Sisir Adhikari and elder brother Suvendu Adhikari have also been elected to Lok Sabha and West Bengal Vidhan Sabha over the years.

Dibyendu was Member of Legislative Assembly (MLA) in West Bengal from Dakhin Kanthi constituency from 2009 to 2016. In 2016, he was elected to Lok Sabha from Tamluk parliamentary constituency of West Bengal on TMC ticket in a by-election when the seat fell vacant due to the resignation of the sitting MP Suvendu Adhikari, who is Dibyendu Adhikari's elder brother. He is also councillor of Contai Municipality.

References

1976 births
Living people
Trinamool Congress politicians from West Bengal
Lok Sabha members from West Bengal
India MPs 2014–2019
People from Purba Medinipur district
India MPs 2019–present